Centroberyx druzhinini is a member of the family Berycidae found in the Western Indian Ocean and Western Pacific Ocean near Japan and New Caledonia.

References

External links
 

Berycidae
Fish described in 1981
Fish of the Pacific Ocean